
Posthoorn is the restaurant of Suitehotel De Posthoorn in Monnickendam, Netherlands. It is a fine dining restaurant that was awarded one Michelin star for the period 2009-present.

GaultMillau awarded the restaurant 15 out of 20 points.

Head chef of Posthoorn is Jeroen Bavelaar. He took over from Rogier van Dam, who left the restaurant in 2010.

Hotel De Posthoorn, with its new restaurant, reopened in 2005. The original hotel started as a stable and inn in 1888.

See also
List of Michelin starred restaurants in the Netherlands

References

Restaurants in the Netherlands
Michelin Guide starred restaurants in the Netherlands